The E. Clem Wilson Building, also called the Samsung Building, is a  Art Deco / Art Moderne midrise building at 5225 Wilshire Boulevard at La Brea Avenue in Los Angeles,  California.

The building is currently managed by VisionQuest Ventures.

The building has had multiple different names from signage rights, starting with Mutual of Omaha, then becoming Asahi Breweries in 1992 and Samsung in 2001. It now remains a blank blue sign.

References

Further reading
http://digitallibrary.usc.edu/cdm/ref/collection/p15799coll44/id/90043
http://losangelespast.blogspot.ca/2009/11/old-civic-center-south-to-city-hall.html

Art Deco architecture in California
Office buildings completed in 1929
Skyscraper office buildings in Los Angeles